Milho Branco is a settlement in the northern part of the island of Santiago, Cape Verde. It is part of the municipality of Tarrafal. In 2010 its population was 165. It is located about 5 km southeast of Tarrafal.

References

Villages and settlements in Santiago, Cape Verde
Tarrafal Municipality